Afghanistan participated in the 2006 Asian Games held in Doha, Qatar from December 1 to December 15, 2006. This country was represented by  42 athletes participating in 10 sports. Nesar Ahmad Bahave won a bronze medal in the men's -72 kg taekwondo tournament.

Medalists

References 

Nations at the 2006 Asian Games
2006
Asian Games